Dragutin Zelenović (19 May 1928 – 27 April 2020) was a professor at the University of Novi Sad, Faculty of Technical Sciences, served as rector of the University of Novi Sad (1987–89) and was in 1987 elected a corresponding member of Serbian Academy of Sciences and Arts. He served as the prime minister of Serbia in 1991. He also served as a member of the Presidency of Yugoslavia from 1989 to 1991.

Zelenović died on 27 April 2020 in Novi Sad.

References

External links
 Serbian Academy of Sciences and Arts biography 

1928 births
2020 deaths
People from Temerin
Prime Ministers of Serbia
Serbian scientists
Academic staff of the University of Novi Sad
Members of the Serbian Academy of Sciences and Arts
Socialist Party of Serbia politicians
Rectors of universities and colleges in Serbia